Andrea Paggiaro, better known as Tuono Pettinato, (12 July 1976 – 14 June 2021) was an Italian comics writer and illustrator.

Selected works

 Apocalypso! Gli anni dozzinali, Coniglio Editore, 2010
 Garibaldi. Resoconto veritiero delle sue valorose imprese, ad uso delle giovani menti, Rizzoli Lizard, 2010
 Il magnifico lavativo, TopiPittori, 2011
 Enigma. La strana vita di Alan Turing, with Francesca Riccioni, Rizzoli Lizard, 2012
 Corpicino, GRRRzetic, 2013
 Nevermind, Rizzoli Lizard, 2014
 OraMai, COMICS & SCIENCE @CERN, CNR Edizioni, 2014

References

External links
 tuonopettinato.blogspot.it - Official blog

1976 births
2021 deaths
Italian comics writers
Italian illustrators
People from Pisa